Lake County is a county located in the northwest corner of the U.S. state of Tennessee. As of the 2020 census, the population was 7,005, making it the fifth-least populous county in Tennessee. Its county seat is Tiptonville. It shares a border with Kentucky to the north and is separated from Missouri to the west by the Mississippi River.

Reelfoot Lake, formed after the New Madrid earthquakes in the early 19th century, occupies much of the northern part of the county. Issues of control of the lake and the development of cotton plantations in this part of the county resulted in violence by local farmers against corporate owners in 1908; the state called in the militia to suppress night riding. Reelfoot Lake and surrounding property were finally acquired by the state beginning in 1914. It is now within the Reelfoot Lake State Park and preserved for public use. The Northwest Correctional Complex in Tiptonville, a state prison first opened in 1981, can house up to 2,391 male prisoners, a significant share of the county's population.

History
The history of Lake County has been largely defined by Reelfoot Lake, a natural lake created by the New Madrid earthquakes of 1811 and 1812. It is surrounded by wetlands. This territory was originally included in Obion County.

In 1862, during the Civil War, the Battle of Island Number Ten took place in the Mississippi River, just off the shores of Obion County, in territory now part of Lake County.

The county was organized in 1870, during the Reconstruction era. Its residents had long complained about the difficulty of having to traverse swampy areas during seasonal high waters around Reelfoot Lake to reach the county seat, then Troy, Tennessee, located to the east of the lake. After the new Lake County was established, Tiptonville was designated as its county seat.

In 1907 and 1908, a violent conflict took place in Lake and Obion counties, and neighboring Fulton County, Kentucky, which also had frontage on the lake. Private investors bought title to most of the land around the lake, gaining control, and formed the West Tennessee Land Company, to develop the property. In this era, western Tennessee and Kentucky were being developed for cotton culture and the lowlands around the lake were fertile floodplain. They announced plans to drain the lake. A band of local farmers and others who made their living from the lake, organized resistance, becoming known as the "Night Riders of Reelfoot Lake."

Beginning with the burning of John Carlos Burdick's fish docks on April 12, 1908, they committed crimes over a period of months, harassing the land company's employees. In October 1908 they kidnapped two attorneys and lynched one, Quentin Rankin, who was also a shareholder in the land company. The other escaped. Given this attack and murder, Governor Malcolm Patterson personally led the Tennessee National Guard into the area, and arrested hundreds of suspected Night Riders. The Night Riders also rode against African Americans, as they were resisting the increase of blacks in the counties, some of whom had come to work as sharecroppers on newly developed cotton plantations. Since the late 19th century, the white-dominated legislature had passed Jim Crow laws and increasing restrictions on voters.

The state gained title to Reelfoot Lake in 1914 to preserve it for public use, but actions were tied up for some years in court challenges. To prevent private development from restricting its use, in 1925 Governor Austin Peay designated the lake as a hunting and fishing reserve. This was the precedent for the larger area to be preserved as the modern Reelfoot Lake State Park.

From 1877 to 1950, there were 13 lynchings of blacks in Lake County, the third-highest number in the state. Neighboring Obion County had 18 lynchings. These were high rates for counties with relatively small populations; Shelby County had the highest total, 20 lynchings in that period. Most of these murders were committed in the decades around the turn of the century, during the period of heightened violence related to opposition to corporate control of Reelfoot Lake and the introduction of cotton plantations and African-American workers to this area.

Geography
It is the fifth-smallest county in Tennessee by area.

Adjacent counties
Fulton County, Kentucky (north)
Obion County (east)
Dyer County (south)
Pemiscot County, Missouri (west)
New Madrid County, Missouri (northwest)

National protected areas
Lake Isom National Wildlife Refuge
Reelfoot National Wildlife Refuge (part)

State protected areas
Reelfoot Lake State Natural Area (part)
Reelfoot Lake State Park (part)
Tumbleweed Wildlife Management Area (part)

Demographics
From 1950 to 1990 the population declined noticeably, as many African Americans moved to cities or to the West Coast in the Great Migration of the second half of the 20th century.

2020 census

As of the 2020 United States census, there were 7,005 people, 2,243 households, and 1,498 families residing in the county.

2000 census
As of the census of 2000, there were 7,954 people, 2,410 households, and 1,614 families residing in the county. The population density was 49 people per square mile (19/km2). There were 2,716 housing units at an average density of 17 per square mile (6/km2). The racial makeup of the county was 66.63% White, 31.19% Black or African American, 0.39% Native American, 0.14% Asian, 0.62% from other races, and 1.03% from two or more races. 1.37% of the population were Hispanic or Latino of any race.

There were 2,410 households, out of which 28.80% had children under the age of 18 living with them, 47.20% were married couples living together, 16.30% had a female householder with no husband present, and 33.00% were non-families. 30.00% of all households were made up of individuals, and 15.50% had someone living alone who was 65 years of age or older. The average household size was 2.36 and the average family size was 2.92.

In the county, the population was spread out, with 17.70% under the age of 18, 13.70% from 18 to 24, 33.80% from 25 to 44, 21.50% from 45 to 64, and 13.30% who were 65 years of age or older. The median age was 36 years. For every 100 females there were 151.00 males. For every 100 females age 18 and over, there were 163.40 males.

The median income for a household in the county was $21,995, and the median income for a family was $30,339. Males had a median income of $25,082 versus $18,700 for females. The per capita income for the county was $10,794. About 19.90% of families and 23.60% of the population were below the poverty line, including 35.10% of those under age 18 and 25.10% of those age 65 or over.

Media

Radio stations
 WTNV FM 97.3
 KMIS-AM 1050

Newspaper
 The Lake County Banner

Education
Lake County High School (9–12)
Lara Kendall Elementary School (K–8)
Margaret Newton Elementary School (K–6)

Communities

Towns
Ridgely
 Tiptonville (county seat)

Unincorporated communities

 Blue Bank
 Madie
 Wynnburg
 Magnolia Beach

Politics
Prior to 2008, Lake County was a Democratic Party stronghold in presidential elections. During the period between 1880 and 2004 it only failed to back that party's presidential candidates in 1968 and 1972. Since then, the county has become increasingly Republican, with Hillary Clinton failing to even crack thirty percent of the county's vote despite her husband Bill Clinton winning over sixty percent in 1992 and 1996.

See also
National Register of Historic Places listings in Lake County, Tennessee

References

External links

 Reelfoot Chamber of Commerce
 Lake County, TNGenWeb – free genealogy resources for the county

 
1870 establishments in Tennessee
Populated places established in 1870
Tennessee counties on the Mississippi River
West Tennessee